The 1954 Jordan League was the 9th season of Jordan Premier League, the top-flight league for Jordanian association football clubs. The championship was won by Al-Ahli.

References

External links
 Jordan Football Association website

Jordanian Pro League seasons
Jordan
Jordan
football